Dennis the Menace is a 1986–1988 animated series produced by DIC Animation City (with season 2 co-produced by Crawleys Animation), based on the comic strip by Hank Ketcham.

The series was originally aired in syndication in the United States, distributed by The Program Exchange. The second season aired on Saturday mornings on CBS. Each half-hour series consists of three six- or seven-minute episodes. The show was sponsored by General Mills, who are also credited as the show's copyright owner.

Cast

 Brennan Thicke as Dennis Mitchell
 Phil Hartman and Maurice LaMarche as Henry Mitchell, George Wilson and Ruff (season 1 and 2, respectively)
 Louise Vallance as Alice Mitchell and Martha Wilson (season 1)
 Marilyn Lightstone as Alice Mitchell and Martha Wilson (season 2); and PeeBee Kappa
 Jeannie Elias as Joey McDonald, Tommy Anderson and Margaret Wade
 Donna Christie and Sharon Noble as Gina Gillotti
 Riva Spier as Jay Weldon

Episode list
78 episodes were produced:

Season 1 (1986)
 So Long, Old Paint/Trembly Assembly/Private I (September 22, 1986)
 A Visitor from Outer Space/Train That Boy/Genie Madness (September 23, 1986)
 Cheer Up/Ghost Blusters/The Life You Save (September 24, 1986)
 Shark Treatment/Jungle Bungle/Racetrack Menace (September 25, 1986)
 All the President's Menace/The Love Rowboat/Wilson the Menace (September 26, 1986)
 Fishing for Trouble/Future Fortune/Time Bomb (September 29, 1986)
 Spa Blahs/Whale of a Tale/Disaster on the Green (September 30, 1986)
 Here, Kitty!/Circus Berserkus/The Monster of Mudville Flats (October 1, 1986)
 The Price of Stardom/Space Menace/The Magic Flute (October 2, 1986)
 Dennis' Yard Sale/The Abominable Snow Menace/It Came from the Planet Dennis (October 3, 1986)
 Ruff's Hat Trick/A Moving Experience/Lemon-Aid (October 6, 1986)
 Chitty Chitty Moon Walk/Wet 'N Wild/Dennis at the Movies (October 7, 1986)
 The Supermarket/The Big Candied Apple/The Defective Detector (October 8, 1986)
 Henry the Menace/Come Fly with Me/Camping Out (October 9, 1986)
 Up Up and Away (From Here)/Going Ape/Dennis the Pirate (October 10, 1986)
 It's a Ruff Life/Professor Myron Mentalapse/Dennis Race 2000 (October 13, 1986)
 A Better Mousetrap/The Wizzer of Odd/Canine Car Wash (October 14, 1986)
 Ride 'Em Cowboy/Tenting Tonight/A Hair Raising Tale (October 15, 1986)
 Snowman Madness/The Invisible Kid/Home Destruction (October 16, 1986)
 Hopping Mad/Mayan Mayhem/The Big Power Trip (October 17, 1986)
 Strong Medicine/Gold Strike/Lights! Camera! Mud! (October 20, 1986)
 Invasion of the Blob/Wild West Show-Down/The Hen Party (October 21, 1986)
 Up Up and Oh Boy!/The Company Picnic/Aw Nuts! (October 22, 1986)
 Clip-Joint Capers/Tanks for the Memory/Second Honeymoon (October 23, 1986) 
 A Couple of Coo-Coos/The Cloneheads/Nothing But the Tooth (October 24, 1986)
 Mummy's Little Boy/Horsing Around/Dennis Plasters Pamplona (October 27, 1986)
 Dennis Predicts/Dennis & the Kangaroo Cavalry/Meatball Mess (October 28, 1986)
 My Fair Dennis/A Good Knight's Work/Life in the Fast Lane (October 29, 1986)
 A Nightmare at the Opera/A Royal Pain/Having a Marbleous Time (October 30, 1986)
 Marky the Menace/Dennis the Genius/A Step Ahead (October 31, 1986)
 The Boss Gets Scalped/Mr. Dennistein/Lean Green Jumping Machine (November 3, 1986)
 The Bicycle Thief/Menace of the Mine Shaft/Margaret's Birthday Party (November 4, 1986)
 Medieval Evil/Beaver-Mania/Say Uncle (November 5, 1986)
 Sounds in the Night/Dennis Does Hollywood/Ruff to the Rescue (November 6, 1986)
 Laundry Business/Journey to the Center of Uncle Charlie's Farm/Dennis Springs Into Action (November 7, 1986) 
 Double Dennis/Timber Wolves/Help Not Wanted (November 10, 1986)
 Ruff's Masterpiece/Going to the Dogs/Big Baby (November 11, 1986)
 Building a Better Dog House/Dennis and the Dragon/Hic! (November 12, 1986)
 Million Dollar Dennis/3-D and Me/Barber Shop Disharmony  (November 13, 1986)
 Give a Little Whistle/Charmed I'm Sure/After Hours (November 14, 1986) 
 Baseball's Best Ballplayer/Mr. Wilson's Diet/The Backyard Band (November 17, 1986)
 So Sorry!/Shock Therapy/Yard Wars (November 18, 1986)
 Strike Up the Band/Queen of Chinatown/Tale of a Tux (November 19, 1986)
 Bowling for Dennis/Dennis Conquers the Navy/The Longest Half-Yard (November 20, 1986) 
 Vampire Scare/Give Me Liberty or Give Me Dennis/Wilson for Mayor (November 21, 1986)
 Dangerous Detour/The Prodigy/The Chimp (November 24, 1986)
 High Steel/Bicycle Mania/Little Dogs Lost (November 25, 1986)
 Dennis Destroys Dallas/Black & Blue Hawaii/Oil's Well That Ends Well (November 26, 1986) 
 Door to Door Bore/Dennis in Venice/Young Sherlock Dennis (November 27, 1986)
 Surf's Up/Yo Ho Ho/The Karate Kiddie (November 28, 1986)
 Dennis and the Deep/K-9 Kollege/Housepests (December 1, 1986) 
 Animalympics/No Bones About It/Dennis Takes the Cake (December 2, 1986) 
 Quiet Riot/The Magic Pen/A Feeling for Stealing (December 3, 1986) 
 Househusband Henry/Wheeling & Double-Dealing/Stop That Car! (December 4, 1986) 
 Lights, Camera, Auction!/Boy Ahoy/Faulty Alarm (December 5, 1986) 
 Attack of the Giant Tomatoes/The Dinosaur Doozy/Funhouse Grouch (December 8, 1986) 
 Dennis the Businessman/Soccer it to Me, Dennis/Camp Over Here-Over There (December 9, 1986)
 Hullaballoo at the Harmony Homes/Phantom of the Wax Museum/Dennis and the Gypsy Woman (December 10, 1986)
 Hail to the Chief/Dennis in Microchipland/Handy Dandy Dennis (December 11, 1986)
 Back to the Drawing Board/Part-Time Helper/G.I. George (December 12, 1986)
 Dennis Rocks Out/Deserted with Dennis/Fashionable Menace (December 15, 1986)
 Wanted: Scarface Wilson/Ruff Come Home/10-4 Dennis (December 16, 1986) 
 Heroes Unwelcome/The Martians are Coming/Ancient Olympics (December 17, 1986) 
 Pool Haul/Fool for Gold/Nothin' to Be Afraid Of (December 18, 1986) 
 Yankee Doodle Dennis/Dennis the Barnstormer/Trial and Error (December 19, 1986)

Season 2 (1988)
 Frankenstymied/Space Race/The Incredible Shrinking Dennis (January 2, 1988) 
 Crummy Mummy/Swiss Family Mitchell/Pie in the Eye (January 9, 1988) 
 Instant Replay/Underwater Wonderland/Safe at Home (January 16, 1988) 
 It's Magic Time/Dennis in Wonderland/Water on the Brain (January 23, 1988) 
 The Great Pie Swap/Climb of the Century/Little Beauty Shop of Horrors (January 30, 1988) 
 Tunnel Vision/Super Duper Dennis/Ice Show Show-Off (February 6, 1988)
 Snow Wars/The Moroccan Pigeon/Dennis of the Jungle (February 13, 1988) 
 Young At Heart/Thor-Sicle/A Word From Our Sponsor (February 20, 1988) 
 A Froggy Day/Loch Ness Mess/Box Office Smash (February 27, 1988) 
 Menaced Marriage/Dennis of the Yukon/Seal of Approval (March 5, 1988) 
 A Fox Tale/Gorilla Warfare/Shared Interest (March 12, 1988) 
 Kooked Goose/Pell Mell Hotel/The Old Ball Game (March 19, 1988) 
 The Wright Stuff/Hassle in the Castle/Wilson's Night Out (March 26, 1988)

Home video

VHS
In 1987, CBS/Fox Video (under the Playhouse Video branding) made a 75-minute VHS three-volume series, by combining the stories into direct-to-video movies, and the producers created new transitional segments. The 65 episodes that was planned to be released on videocassette by Family Home Entertainment via a contract was signed in November 1985, then it was proceeded into a lawsuit by the show's producers, DIC Enterprises. On June 2, 1993, CBS/FOX Video released seven VHS compilations in the United States:

Dennis' Great Adventure – contains the episodes All the President's Menace, The Abominable Snow Menace, Dennis in Venice and The Big Candied Apple.

Animal Antics – contains the episodes Lean, Green Jumping Machine, Shark Treatment, Jungle Bungle and Dinosaur Doozy.

Boys Will Be Boys – contains the episodes Disaster on the Green, Baseball's Best Ballplayer, Soccer it to Me, Dennis and Racetrack Menace.

Spies, Robbers and Ghosts – contains the episodes Ghost Blusters, The Monster of Mudville Flats, Young Sherlock Dennis and The Defective Detector.

Movie Exclusive - The Mitchell's Move (1987) - Dennis' father Henry gets promoted to a new job in his business, only his job is in Alaska, and Dennis and his family have to move in one week. Features the episodes The Boss Gets Scalped, The Big Candied Apple, Going to the Dogs, Vampire Scare, A Royal Pain, Trembly Assembly, and Shock Therapy.

Dennis the Menace: Memory Mayhem (1987) - Features the episodes Future Fortune, A Good Knight's Work, A Moving Experience, Home Destruction, The Invisible Kid, Tanks for the Memories, and Cheer Up.

Dennis the Menace: Dennis the Movie Star (1988)

DVD releases
On March 18, 2008, Fox Home Entertainment released a select 7-episode DVD entitled Dennis the Menace: Trouble, Trouble Everywhere in Region 1. This compilation includes the episodes Dennis in Venice, Mayan Mayhem, The Big Candied Apple, A Royal Pain, Dennis and the Kangaroo Cavalry, Dennis Plasters Pamplona and Black and Blue Hawaii.

On March 18, 2014, Mill Creek Entertainment released Dennis the Menace – Volume One on DVD in Region 1. The 3-disc set contains the first 33 episodes of the series. On August 5, 2014, Mill Creek released Dennis the Menace - Lights! Camera! Menace!, which contains the remaining 32 episodes from the first season.

In the UK the third series (1993) was released on a number of DVDs, each containing two classic episodes. These DVDs were also released in a box set and later re-released along with the 2002 special.

On September 6, 2016, Mill Creek released Dennis the Menace- The Complete Series 1&2 on DVD in Region 1 for the very first time. The 9-disc set contains all 78 episodes of the 1986–1988 series, including the final 13 episodes which were previously unreleased.

References

External links

 
 

1980s American animated television series
1986 American television series debuts
1988 American television series endings
1980s French animated television series
1986 French television series debuts
1988 French television series endings
American children's animated comedy television series
French children's animated comedy television series
Animated television series about children
CBS original programming
Dennis the Menace (U.S. comics) television series
English-language television shows
First-run syndicated television programs in the United States
Television series by DIC Entertainment
Television shows based on comic strips